Quail Hollow is a neighborhood in south Charlotte roughly located in between Park Road and Carmel Road, south of Dilworth and north of Ballantyne and Pineville. The neighborhood is largely residential. It is adjacent to Quail Hollow Club, which is home of the Wells Fargo Championship PGA Tournament. Growth and land value in this area has been on the rise due to its location near Interstate 77 and 485, and proximity to SouthPark, Pineville and Ballantyne.

External links

Neighborhoods in Charlotte, North Carolina